KSCB may refer to:

 KSCB (AM), a radio station (1270 AM) licensed to Liberal, Kansas, United States
 KSCB-FM, a radio station (107.5 FM) licensed to Liberal, Kansas, United States
 K53EG, a television station (channel 53) licensed to Sioux Falls, South Dakota, United States, also known as KSCB-TV
 Scribner State Airport (ICAO code KSCB)